The word Nilakantha may refer to:

 Shiva, one of the principal deities of Hinduism
 Nilakantha (spider), a genus of jumping spiders
 Neelakantha Chaturdhara (Nīlakaṇṭha Caturdhara), seventeenth-century commentator on the Mahābhārata
 Nīlakantha dhāranī, a Mahayana Buddhist mantra
 Nilakantha Somayaji, mathematician of the Kerala school
 Nilakantha Daivajna, 16th century astronomer-astrologer